Calabogie Lake is a reservoir lake in the municipality of Greater Madawaska, Renfrew County in Eastern Ontario, Canada. It is on the Madawaska River system, is part of the Saint Lawrence River drainage basin, and is located in the geographic townships of Bagot Township and Blythfield Township.

The original natural lake expanded to its current dimensions upon the completion of the Calabogie Station dam and generating station (now owned and operated by Ontario Power Generation) during World War I.

The communities of Calabogie, Grassy Bay and Barryvale are on the lake. Renfrew County Road 511 crosses the lake in Calabogie near the river mouth, and Renfrew County Road 508 runs along the northwest shore.

Tributaries
Clockwise from the mouth
Stoughtons Creek
Madawaska River
Constant Creek

References

External links

Reservoirs in Canada
Lakes of Renfrew County